Ultimus may refer to:
Ultimus haeres, a concept in Scots law
Ultimus Romanorum, Latin for Last of the Romans
Ultimus, a Kree villain that appears in the Marvel Universe